The Formosan languages are a geographic grouping comprising the languages of the indigenous peoples of Taiwan, all of which are Austronesian. They do not form a single subfamily of Austronesian but rather nine separate subfamilies. The Taiwanese indigenous peoples recognized by the government are about 2.3% of the island's population. However, only 35% speak their ancestral language, due to centuries of language shift. Of the approximately 26 languages of the Taiwanese indigenous peoples, at least ten are extinct, another four (perhaps five) are moribund, and all others are to some degree endangered.

The aboriginal languages of Taiwan have great significance in historical linguistics since, in all likelihood, Taiwan is the place of origin of the entire Austronesian language family. According to American linguist Robert Blust, the Formosan languages form nine of the ten principal branches of the family, while the one remaining principal branch, Malayo-Polynesian, contains nearly 1,200 Austronesian languages found outside Taiwan. Although some other linguists disagree with some details of Blust's analysis, a broad consensus has coalesced around the conclusion that the Austronesian languages originated in Taiwan, and the theory has been strengthened by recent studies in human population genetics.

Recent history

All Formosan languages are slowly being replaced by the culturally dominant Taiwanese Mandarin. In recent decades the Taiwan government started an aboriginal reappreciation program that included the reintroduction of Formosan first languages in Taiwanese schools. However, the results of this initiative have been disappointing.

In 2005, in order to help with the preservation of the languages of the indigenous people of Taiwan, the council established a Romanized writing system for all of Taiwan's aboriginal languages. The council has also helped with classes and language certification programs for members of the indigenous community and the non-Formosan Taiwanese to help the conservation movement.

Classification

Formosan languages form nine distinct branches of the Austronesian language family (with all other Malayo-Polynesian languages forming the tenth branch of the Austronesian).

List of languages
It is often difficult to decide where to draw the boundary between a language and a dialect, causing some minor disagreement among scholars regarding the inventory of Formosan languages. There is even more uncertainty regarding possible extinct or assimilated Formosan peoples. Frequently cited examples of Formosan languages are given below, but the list should not be considered exhaustive.

Living languages

 Although Yami is geographically in Taiwan, it is not classified as Formosan in linguistics.

Extinct languages

Basic word order
Most Formosan languages display verb-initial word order (VSO (verb-subject-object) or VOS (verb-object-subject)) with the exception of some Northern Formosan languages, such as Thao, Saisiyat, and Pazih, possibly from influence from Chinese.

Li (1998) lists the word orders of several Formosan languages.

Rukai: VSO, VOS
Tsou: VOS
Bunun: VSO
Atayal: VSO, VOS
Saisiyat: VS, SVO
Pazih: VOS, SVO
Thao: VSO, SVO
Amis: VOS, VSO
Kavalan: VOS
Puyuma: VSO
Paiwan: VSO, VOS

Sound changes
Tanan Rukai is the Formosan language with the largest number of phonemes with 23 consonants and 4 vowels containing length contrast, while Kanakanavu and Saaroa have the fewest phonemes with 13 consonants and 4 vowels.

Wolff
The tables below list the Proto-Austronesian reflexes of individual languages given by Wolff (2010).

Blust
The following table lists reflexes of Proto-Austronesian *j in various Formosan languages (Blust 2009:572).

The following table lists reflexes of Proto-Austronesian *ʀ in various Formosan languages (Blust 2009:582).

Lenition patterns include (Blust 2009:604-605):

 *b, *d in Proto-Austronesian 
 *b > f, *d > c, r in Tsou
 *b > v, *d > d in Puyuma
 *b > v, *d > d, r in Paiwan
 *b > b, *d > r in Saisiyat
 *b > f, *d > s in Thao
 *b > v, *d > r in Yami (extra-Formosan)

Distributions

Gallery

Information
Li (2001) lists the geographical homelands for the following Formosan languages.

Tsou: southwestern parts of central Taiwan; Yushan (oral traditions)
Saisiyat and Kulon: somewhere between Tatu River and Tachia River not far from the coast
Thao: Choshui River
Qauqaut: mid-stream of Takiri River (Liwuhsi in Chinese)
Siraya: Chianan Plains
Makatau: Pingtung
Bunun: Hsinyi (信義鄉) in Nantou County
Paiwan: Ailiao River, near the foot of the mountains

See also
 Cognate sets for Formosan languages (Wiktionary)
 Demographics of Taiwanese Aborigines
 Writing systems of Formosan languages
 Personal pronoun systems of Formosan languages
 Fossilized affixes in Austronesian languages
 Proto-Austronesian language
 Tsou language for an example of the unusual phonotactics of the Formosan languages
 Sinckan Manuscripts
 Naming customs of Taiwanese aborigines

References

Citations

Sources

Further reading
Blundell, David (2009), Austronesian Taiwan: Linguistics, History, Ethnology, Prehistory. Taipei, Taiwan: SMC Publishing
Happart, G., & Hedhurst, W. H. (1840). Dictionary of the Favorlang dialect of the Formosan language. Batavia: printed at Parapattan.
Li, Paul Jen-kuei (2004). "Basic Vocabulary for Formosan Languages and Dialects." In Li, Paul Jen-kuei. Selected Papers on Formosan Languages, vol. 2. Taipei, Taiwan: Institute of Linguistics, Academia Sinica.
 
Tsuchida, S. (2003). Kanakanavu texts (Austronesian Formosan). [Osaka?: Endangered Languages of the Pacific Rim].
Zeitoun, E. (2002). Nominalization in Formosan languages. Taipei: Institute of Linguistics (Preparatory Office), Academia Sinica.

External links 
 Ogawa's Vocabulary of Formosan Dialects 小川尚義 (臺灣蕃語蒐録)
 Academia Sinica's Formosan Language Archive project
 Linguistics and Formosan Languages
 Yuánzhùmínzú yǔyán xiànshàng cídiǎn 原住民族語言線上詞典  – "Aboriginal language online dictionary" website of the Indigenous Languages Research and Development Foundation
 Zú yǔ E lèyuán 族語E樂園  – Educational site maintained by Taiwan's Council of Indigenous Peoples
 T.A.I.W.A.N. – Taiwan-Austronesion Indigenous Words and Narrations – English counterpart of Zú yǔ E lèyuán
 Map:  Formosan Languages and Yami (PDF)

 
Austronesian languages
Languages of Taiwan
Endangered Austronesian languages